This committee of the United States Senate was created November 4, 1807. On January 2, 1947, its functions were transferred to the Committee on Rules and Administration.

Chairmen of the Committee to Audit and Control the Contingent Expenses of the Senate, 1811-1947
Michael Leib (R-PA) 1811-1815
Abner Lacock (R-PA) 1815-1819
Jonathan Roberts (R-PA) 1819-1821
James Lanman (R-CT) 1821-1822
Nathaniel Macon (R-NC) 1822-1823
Horatio Seymour (R-VT) 1823-1826
Elias Kane (D-IL) 1826-1830
James Iredell (D-NC) 1830-1831
Nehemiah Knight (NR/W-RI) 1831-1835
Samuel McKean (D-PA) 1835-1839
Nehemiah Knight (W-RI) 1839-1841
Albert S. White (W-IN) 1841-1842
Benjamin Tappan (D-OH) 1842-1845
Jesse Speight (D-MS) 1845-1846
Alpheus Felch (D-MI) 1847-1848
Isaac P. Walker (D-WI) 1848-1849
Augustus Dodge (D-IA) 1849-1853
Josiah Evans (D-SC) 1853-1858
William Wright (D-NJ) 1858-1859
Andrew Johnson (D-TN) 1859-1861
James Dixon (R-CT) 1861-1865
B. Gratz Brown (R-MO) 1865-1866
George H. Williams (R-OR) 1866-1867
Aaron Cragin (R-NH) 1867-1870
Orris S. Ferry (R-CT) 1870-1871
Reuben Fenton (R-NY) 1871-1872
Matthew Carpenter (R-WI) 1872-1875
John P. Jones (R-NV) 1875-1879
Benjamin Hill (D-GA) 1879-1881
John P. Jones (R-NV) 1881-1893
Edward Douglass White (D-LA) 1893-1894
Johnson N. Camden (D-WV) 1894-1895
John P. Jones (R-NV) 1895-1903
John Kean (R-NJ) 1903-1911
Frank O. Briggs (R-NJ) 1911-1913
John Sharp Williams (D-MS) 1913-1916
Luke Lea (D-TN) 1916-1917
William H. Thompson (D-KS) 1917-1919
William M. Calder (R-NY) 1919-1923
Henry W. Keyes (R-NH) 1923-1927
Charles S. Deneen (R-IL) 1927-1931
John G. Townsend, Jr. (R-DE) 1931-1933
James F. Byrnes (D-SC) 1933-1941
Scott W. Lucas (D-IL) 1941-1947

Sources 

Chairmen of Senate Standing Committees U.S. Senate Historical Office, January 2005.

Audit and Control the Contingent Expenses of the Senate
1807 establishments in the United States
1947 disestablishments in Washington, D.C.